The Original Outlet Mall was an indoor outlet mall located in Kenosha, Wisconsin. Opening in 1982 as the first outlet mall in Wisconsin, the mall was demolished in two phases from 2005 to 2006, with an Ashley HomeStore built on part of the site.

History 
The mall was sold for $17 million to Clearview Investments Ltd of Arlington, Texas in January 1998, who immediately announced plans to remodel the mall in order to attract new tenants. The mall was sold again in 2000 to Jaeger & Jaeger of Deerfield, Illinois; at this time, the mall was at 80% occupancy. By 2001, occupancy had improved to 85%, but was still behind newer outlets nearby such as the Johnson Creek Outlet Mall in Johnson Creek, Wisconsin with 97% occupancy, and the Prime Retail Outlets in Pleasant Prairie, Wisconsin with 95% occupancy. By late 2003, occupancy had slipped to 61%, and in January 2004 lenders GMAC Commercial Mortgage Corp and LaSalle National Bank moved to sue the owners, claiming the owners had defaulted on a $20 million loan, and demanded the mall be sold at sheriff's auction. The property was handed back to the lenders in February that year, who announced they were looking to sell the mall within the year. The mall was later acquired in December 2004 by American Realty Advisors, in a joint venture with the Tucker Development Corporation. Plans called to continue operating the site as an outlet mall in the near future, but to later redevelop the property into a 300,000 square foot community shopping center. 

By January 2006, demolition had commenced on northern portion of the mall, with the small number of remaining tenants condensed into the southern wing of the mall, on short-term leases. By August, demolition of the mall had been finished, with construction of an Ashley HomeStore on the grounds already in progress. Also planned for the site were three 8,000 square foot commercial sites, a 121-room hotel on the site, and four additional lots left for future expansion.

References

Buildings and structures in Kenosha, Wisconsin
Demolished shopping malls in the United States
Outlet malls in the United States
Shopping malls in Wisconsin
Shopping malls established in 1982
2006 disestablishments in Wisconsin